St Anne's Church in Haughton, Denton, Greater Manchester, England, is a Grade I Listed Building. The foundation stone was laid on the 1st September 1880 and the church was finally completed on the 29th July 1882. The building was designed by J. Medland Taylor  and the construction was funded by E. Joseph Sidebotham, a member of the Sidebotham mill-owning family of Hyde. The church was built in brick in the Gothic Revival style, but also utilised timber framing.

It has been described as the best-known work of the architects, an 'extraordinary free-form brick church that forms the nucleus of the most important cluster of their buildings' surviving. The lychgate and rectory that adjoin the main church are also of architectural significance, and each is on the register of protected buildings in its own right.

See also

Grade I listed churches in Greater Manchester
Listed buildings in Denton, Greater Manchester
List of churches in Greater Manchester

References

Churches completed in 1882
Buildings and structures in Tameside
Grade I listed churches in Greater Manchester
Church of England church buildings in Greater Manchester
Gothic Revival church buildings in Greater Manchester
Anglican Diocese of Manchester
1882 establishments in England
Denton, Greater Manchester